Randy "The Arsonist" Cooper (born ) is the former guitarist for American rock band Emperors and Elephants as well as American red dirt metal band Texas Hippie Coalition. Cooper also acted as a session guitarist on American southern rock band Shotgun Rebellion's debut album Train of Pain in addition to performing on a limited number of dates with the band.

History 
Cooper moved to Denison, Texas when he was 16 years of age.  Having met Pantera shortly thereafter, and opening for them as part of Texas Hippie Coalition, he became attracted to Dean Guitars, and played the same Vintage 82 DEAN from 1989 until at least 2009. In 1991, an automobile accident in Oklahoma City turned the guitarist into a quadriplegic, confining him to a wheelchair and forcing him to regain his stride.  After regaining motion in his right arm and both legs, Cooper spent additional time in rehab, recovering only one finger on his left hand.  This contributes to the musician's unique style of playing.

Texas Hippie Coalition 
In mid-2012, Cooper tore a tendon in his right arm, which required extensive rehabilitation. With a pair of cysts under his arm that encircled the tendons, he could only play guitar for a few minutes at a time, which rendered him unable to tour later that year.

Departure from Texas Hippie Coalition 
Following Cooper's departure from Texas Hippie Coalition, the veteran guitarist joined rock band Emperors and Elephants. Additionally, Cooper performed a select number of tour dates with southern rock band Shotgun Rebellion while assisting the ensemble with their debut studio album. Randy Cooper's work also includes a guest appearance on Hell Rider Recording Artist, Scattered Hamlet's debut full length, Skeleton Dixie, where he played lead guitar on "Falling Off the Wagon.". He's also been known to make unannounced guest appearances with the band to play that song live.

In October 2015, it was announced that Emperors and Elephants would begin the new year by starting work on a new album with producer Scott Wilson. Two months later, Cooper and the band announced that they had decided to part ways.

In 2016, Cooper performed a show with American rock band Coming Up Zero.  In 2018, the guitarist started a new band called Victory Season.

Influences 
Cooper's influences include Mötley Crüe and Pantera as well as guitarists Eddie Van Halen, Randy Rhoads, Zakk Wylde and Darrell Abbott.

Equipment 
Cooper uses Dean Guitars and EMG-81/85 pickups. In 2012, the musician was quoted as using a Dean ML.

Discography

Texas Hippie Coalition 
 Pride of Texas (2008) 
 Rollin (2010)
 Peacemaker (2012)

Emperors and Elephants 
 Devil in the Lake (2014)
 Devil in the Lake – Deluxe Edition (2015)
 Moth (2017)

Shotgun Rebellion 
 Train of Pain (2013) (session musician)

Scattered Hamlet 
Skeleton Dixie (2013)  (guest appearance)

References

External links 

American heavy metal guitarists
1967 births
Living people
People from Denison, Texas
Guitarists from Texas
20th-century American guitarists